Sant'Antonio Martire is the main Roman Catholic church, or duomo, in the town of Fara in Sabina, in the province of Rieti, region of Lazio, Italy.

History 
Construction of this church was begun in the 13th-century at the site of a small castle-associated church called Santa Maria in Castello. The church has undergone various restorations over the centuries, and its facade now has an eclectic neo-classical style. In prior centuries, the church had been owned by the nearby Abbey of Farfa and had been elevated to a collegiate church. The Romanesque-style multi level bell-tower with mullioned windows stands apart from the church. 

The interior contains a canvas depicting St Anne and the Virgin (Education of the Virgin) by Vincenzo Manenti and a Crucifixion with the Virgin and St John attributed to followers of Guido Reni. The wooden tabernacle on the main altar was designed by Vignola. A The church has a curious crucifix, fashioned in the East, using human hair. The church has processional silver cross and wooden icon statue of Sant'Antonio in the sacristy.

References

Roman Catholic churches in Lazio
Churches in the province of Rieti
13th-century Roman Catholic church buildings in Italy
Romanesque architecture in Lazio